The 2003 Arab Unified Club Championship preliminary stage decided the teams which played into two zones, Africa and Asia.

 Qualified as holders:  Al-Ahli (Saudi Arabia) (did not enter)
 Qualified as hosts:  Zamalek (Egypt),  ENPPI (Egypt)

Zone 1: (Gulf Area)

 Representatives:  Riffa (Bahrain),  Kuwait SC (Kuwait),  ? (UAE),  ? (Oman),  ? (Qatar)
 Qatar, UAE and Oman representatives withdrew
 Two teams qualified:  Kuwait SC,  Riffa

Zone 2: (Red Sea)

 Representatives:  Al-Ettifaq (Saudi Arabia),  Sha'ab (Ibb) (Yemen)
 No representatives from Egypt, Djibouti, Somalia, Sudan and Comoros Islands

|}

 1 The two matches have been played in Saudi Arabia in 23 and 25 May 2003.

 One teams qualified:  Al-Ettifaq

Zone 3: (North Africa)

 Representatives:  Club Africain (Tunisia),  Raja Casablanca (Morocco),  USM Alger (Algeria)
 No representative from Libya and Mauritania
 No decision was taken for the date of this group, presumably Club Africain withdrew
 Two teams qualified:  USM Alger,  Raja Casablanca

Zone 4: (East Region)

 Representatives:  Nejmeh (Lebanon),  Al-Aqsa (Palestine),  Al-Faisaly (Jordan),  Al-Jaish (Syria)
  Al-Shorta (Iraq) admitted without playing qualification
 The matches have been played in Jordan, from 21–25 May 2003

 Two teams qualified:  Al-Faisaly,  Al-Jaish

External links 
 http://www.rsssf.com/tablesa/arabchamp03.html

preliminary stage
2003 in Asian football
2003 in African football